Phu Quoc International Airport (Vietnamese: Sân bay quốc tế Phú Quốc or Cảng hàng không quốc tế Phú Quốc)  is an international airport that serves Phú Quốc Island, in southern Vietnam. The airport covers nearly 900 hectares of land area in Dương Tơ, situated outside of the city premises. It is built at a cost of around VND 16.2 trillion (US$810 million) and is planned to be built in phases. The airport is 10 km from the previous Phu Quoc Airport, which it replaced.
The airport was initially able to handle about 2.5 million passengers per annum, and the maximum capacity will be 7 million passengers per annum. The airport has a single runway, capable of handling aircraft like the Airbus A350 and Boeing 747.
The construction was completed in November 2012 and was put into operation on 2 December 2012.
The Government of Vietnam expects the airport to facilitate the arrival of international tourists who are attracted to the island's beaches.

History
Airports Corporation of Vietnam began construction of the airport on 23 November 2008 with an investment of VND 3,000 billion. It was designed by Singaporean-US design consulting firm CPG-PAE. After four years work the airport operated its inaugural flight on 15 December 2012.

Airlines and destinations

See also

 Duong Dong Airport

References

External links

Phu Quoc International Airport Guide
Official website of Airports Corporation of Vietnam

Airports in Vietnam
Buildings and structures in Kiên Giang province
Airports established in 2012